Israel Shipyards is one of the largest shipbuilding and repair facilities in the eastern Mediterranean. The company also operates the first and only privately owned port in Israel.
The company’s facilities are located at the Kishon Port (part of the Port of Haifa complex) include a brand new shiplift (syncrolift), capable lifting up to 3000 tons, or 100 meters LOA ships, and about 1000 meters long quay with 12 meters of water depth.

History

The company was founded in 1959 by the State of Israel to build both military and civilian ships, and to provide marine engineering upgrade, maintenance and repair services. In 1995, following years of underperformance and continued losses under state ownership, the company was privatized and sold to a group of local investors who, since 1998, have returned it to profitability.

Today Israel Shipyards is controlled by the Shlomo Group (TASE:SHLD), a holding group owned by businessman Shlomo Shmeltzer.

In May 2013, Israel Shipyard unveiled a new ‘Mini Corvette’ design, the Sa'ar S-72 class; to offer the Israeli Navy a new class, which fits between the Navy’s existing Sa'ar 4.5-class missile boats, and Sa'ar 5-class corvettes. Through the years Israel Shipyards have built 40 Saar  class missile boats; 20 were delivered to the Israeli Navy over the years. Last to be delivered were two upgraded Sa'ar 4.5 Hetz-subclass missile boats called INS Herev (2002) and INS Sufa (2003). With the new Mini Corvette the shipyard hopes to expand its offering to meet the evolving requirements, of the Israeli Navy, as well as of international customers overseas.

Products and services

Naval vessels

Missile boats
 Sa'ar 4-class missile boat
 Sa'ar 4.5-class missile boat
 Sa'ar 72-class corvette

Offshore Patrol Vessels (OPV)
 Sa'ar 62 class offshore patrol vessel
 OPV 45

Fast Patrol Crafts (FPC)

 SHALDAG -class

Past models

 ZIVANIT-class hydrofoils Patrol boats

Merchant vessels

 Tugboats
 Bulk freighters

Ship repairs

The Shipyards has capability and experience to design and execute project such as:
 Damage repair of merchant ships
 Jumboizing of container ships
 Conversion and modification of cargo vessels
 Repairs and maintenance of merchant and Naval vessels

Industrial structures

The company uses its facilities to build and deliver non-ship related commissions; recently completed projects include:

  Panamax and Post Panamax container cranes
  Harbor construction and cargo handling installations
  Coal unloading steel piers and cranes for the Orot Rabin power plant
  Industrial large pressure vessels
  Potash storage and loading installation
  Jet bridges for Ben Gurion International Airport's terminal 3

List of ships built by Israel Shipyards (partial list)

References

External links
 Israel Shipyards home page

Manufacturing companies of Israel
Defense companies of Israel
1959 establishments in Israel
Formerly government-owned companies of Israel
Shipyards of Asia